The 1956 UCI Track Cycling World Championships were the World Championship for track cycling. They took place in Copenhagen, Denmark from 27 August to 2 September 1956. Five events for men were contested, 3 for professionals and 2 for amateurs.

Medal summary

Medal table

See also
 1956 UCI Road World Championships

References

Track cycling
UCI Track Cycling World Championships by year
International cycle races hosted by Denmark
International sports competitions in Copenhagen
1956 in track cycling